William II, Prince of Nassau-Dillenburg (28 August 1670 – 21 September 1724 in Dillenburg) was the ruler (i.e. Fürst) of Nassau-Dillenburg from 1701 until his death. His parents were Henry, Prince of Nassau-Dillenburg (1641–1701) and his wife Princess Dorothea Elisabeth of Legnica-Brzeg (1646–1691).

Life 
Around 1694 he made his grand tour which took him through Germany, the Netherlands, England, Denmark, Sweden and Italy.  After his father's death in 1701 he inherited Nassau-Dillenburg.  In 1711, Francis Alexander died, and William II inherited a share of Nassau-Hadamar.  Negotiations dragged on until 1717; William II received Mengerskirchen, Lahr in the Westerwald, and Frickhofen.

In 1709, he was appointed Knight of the Order of Saint Hubert, which had been revived by Elector Palatine John William in September 1708.

William II died in 1724 and was interred in the Evangelical City Church in Dillenburg.  As he had no male heir, his principality was inherited by his brother Christian.

Marriage and issue
He married on 13 January 1699 in Harzgerode to Johanna Dorothea (24 December 1676 – 29 November 1727), the daughter of Duke Augustus of Schleswig-Holstein-Sonderburg-Plön-Norburg.  They had two children:
 Henry Augustus William (15 November 1700 – 22 August 1718)
 Elisabeth Charlotte (14 July 1703 – 22 June 1720)
The family was interred in the Evangelical City Church in Dillenburg.

Ancestors

External links

Footnotes 

Princes of Nassau
House of Nassau
1670 births
1724 deaths
17th-century German people
18th-century German people